Jean Thibaudin (November 1822 – 1905) was a French general and politician of the French Third Republic. He was educated at the École spéciale militaire de Saint-Cyr in Brittany. He was involved in the colonization of Madagascar.

He was minister of war (31 January – 9 October 1883) in the government of Jules Ferry.

Notes
 Larousse du XXe siècle

References 

1822 births
1905 deaths
People from Nièvre
Politicians from Bourgogne-Franche-Comté
French Ministers of War
Politicians of the French Third Republic
French generals
École Spéciale Militaire de Saint-Cyr alumni
French military personnel of the Franco-Prussian War